Georgievski is a Macedonian-language surname, meaning son of Georgi. Notable people with the surname include:

Daniel Georgievski
Ljubčo Georgievski
Slavčo Georgievski

See also
Georgiyevsky (disambiguation)
Đorđević
Georgiev
George (surname)
George (given name)

Macedonian-language surnames
Patronymic surnames